Deadline is a split album released in 2007 on Alternative Tentacles Records and Fat Wreck Chords. The album features 15 songs from the 2 bands, Leftöver Crack and Citizen Fish. Each band covers two songs. Citizen Fish covers "Money" by Choking Victim, and "Clear Channel (Fuck Off!)" by Leftöver Crack. Leftöver Crack covers "Supermarket Song" by Citizen Fish, and "Reasons for Existence" by The Subhumans.

This album has cameos from Dave Dictor from MDC on the Intro song for the Leftöver Crack portion of the record, and vocals from Jello Biafra on Leftöver Crack's "Baby-Punchers".

Reception
Allmusic writer Corey Apar gave the album four stars, stating "The bleeding urgency that both bands discharge with such directed force and street-level ferocity is truly refreshing...Deadline is surprisingly still incredibly accessible and even poppy." Chris Moran of Punknews.org gave it three and a half stars, calling it "a pleasant piece of punk history". Ty Trumbull, writing foe Exclaim!, viewed it as "a good example of what a split record should be: two bands that, while not completely dissimilar, each bring something different to the table." Andrew Miller for Alternative Press, awarded it three stars, stating that the album "confirms the genre's continued vitality and vigilance".

Track listing
 Citizen Fish - "Working on the Inside" (Dick Lukas) – 2:43
 Citizen Fish - "Money" – (Choking Victim cover) – 2:01
 Citizen Fish - "Meltdown" (Lukas) – 2:43
 Citizen Fish - "Getting Used to It" (Lukas) – 2:30
 Citizen Fish - "Back to Square One" (Lukas) – 3:00 
 Citizen Fish - "Join The Dots" (Lukas) – 3:08
 Citizen Fish - "Clear Channel (Fuck Off!)" – (Leftöver Crack cover) – 2:30
 Leftöver Crack - "L.Ö.C Intro (B.D.C)" - (Featuring Dave Dictor of Millions of Dead Cops) (Ara Crack, Frank DeGeneric, Stza) – 0:57 
 Leftöver Crack - "Baby-Punchers" – (Featuring Jello Biafra) (Crack, DeGeneric, Stza) – 3:29
 Leftöver Crack - "Genocidal Tendencies"  (Brad Logan, Stza) – 3:22
 Leftöver Crack - "...And Out Comes the N-Bomb!" (Crack, DeGeneric, Stza) – 2:13
 Leftöver Crack - "Life Causes Cancer" (Crack, DeGeneric, Stza) – 2:41
 Leftöver Crack - "World War 4" (Ezra Kire, Stza) – 4:03
 Leftöver Crack - "Supermarket Song" – (Citizen Fish cover) – 2:15
 Leftöver Crack - "Reason for Existence" – (Subhumans cover) – 2:20

Personnel 

Naren Rauch Atomic – Engineer, Assistant
Jello Biafra – Vocals on Baby-Punchers
Alec Crack "Shit Boat" – Bass
Ara Crack "Slacka" – Drums
Scott Sturgeon "Stza" – Guitar, Keyboards, Vocals, Producer, Mixing
Dave "Knucklehead" Dictor – Vocals on L.Ö.C Intro (B.D.C)
Alan Douches – Mastering
Rik Dowding – Engineer
Eric Drooker – Artwork
Kristen Ferrell – Logo
Fly – Artwork
Jasper – Bass, Vocals, Artwork
Ezra Kire "Way Way" – Guitar, Keyboards, Vocals
Brad Logan – Guitar, Vocals
Dick Lucas – Cover Painting
Jamie McMann – Producer, Engineer, Mixing

References

2007 albums
Leftöver Crack albums
Citizen Fish albums
Alternative Tentacles albums
Split albums
Fat Wreck Chords albums